The Squeeze is a 1987 American action comedy film directed by Roger Young and starring Michael Keaton and Rae Dawn Chong.  The movie was plagued by production problems, including going over budget.

Plot 
After retrieving a mysterious parcel for his ex-wife, eccentric down-on-his-luck artist Harry Berg (Michael Keaton) enlists the help of private eye Rachel Dobs (Rae Dawn Chong) when he suddenly becomes embroiled with thugs and a murder investigation. The combination of Harry's many comic eccentricities and Rachel's straight-and-narrow, naive personality ends up working in their favor to help solve the crime.

Cast
 Michael Keaton as Harry Berg
 Rae Dawn Chong as Rachel Dobs
 Joe Pantoliano as Norman
 Meat Loaf as Titus
 Danny Aiello III as Ralph Vigo
 Leslie Bevis as Gem Vigo
 Liane Langland as Hilda
 Paul Herman as Freddy

Release
Originally produced as Skip Tracer, this film changed its title to Squeeze Play before settling for The Squeeze.  The working title refers to someone who tracks down delinquent bill payers.  When released in theaters, The Squeeze made only $2.2 million at the U.S. box office. It is most notable for an accident that took place during filming, in which a stunt man was killed driving a car into the Hudson River.

An updated version of the film was briefly released on Netflix, and Comcast had an HD version On Demand in 2008. After being long out-of-print on home media for years, Sony Pictures Home Entertainment released The Squeeze on Blu-ray on March 26, 2019.

Reception
Despite billing itself as a "comedy-thriller on a lucky streak", the film failed to score with most critics. Film historian Leonard Maltin called it "Dreadful...almost completely devoid of laughs or suspense."

On an episode of the movie review show At the Movies, critics Gene Siskel and Roger Ebert lambasted the film, but humorously had a difficult time discerning exactly what the film was about; suggesting its unremarkable premise.

References

External links
 
 
 
 
 

1987 comedy films
1987 films
American comedy films
American comedy thriller films
Films directed by Roger Young
TriStar Pictures films
Films scored by Miles Goodman
Films set in New York City
Films shot in New York City
Films shot in New Jersey
Films shot in North Carolina
1980s English-language films
1980s American films